Igors Kostins (born 27 November 1981 in Rīga) is a retired amateur Latvian Greco-Roman wrestler, who competed in the men's heavyweight category. Kostins represented his nation Latvia at the 2004 Summer Olympics, and has been training for more than 20 years at the Daugmale Wrestling Club in his native hometown Rīga, under his personal coach Andrei Trubetzkoi.

Kostins qualified for the Latvian squad in the men's 96 kg class at the 2004 Summer Olympics in Athens by receiving a berth from the Olympic Qualifying Tournament in Tashkent, Uzbekistan. He received two straight losses and a score of two technical points in a preliminary pool match against Uzbekistan's Aleksey Cheglakov and Turkey's Mehmet Özal, who later picked up the bronze medal in the knockout stages, finishing seventeenth out of twenty-two wrestlers.

In 2011, Kostins turned himself professional as a mixed martial arts fighter, and had competed in numerous global tournaments, where he claimed grand slam heavyweight titles and was ranked among 250 wrestlers under the same division. One of his sporting highlights came in a full throttle match against former UFC titleholder Paul Buentello, where Kostins could not produce a stellar fight against the American and consequently, recorded his first ever defeat in sporting career.

References

External links 
 Igor Kostin at MixedMartialArts.com
 
 
 
 

1981 births
Living people
Latvian male sport wrestlers
Latvian male mixed martial artists
Mixed martial artists utilizing Greco-Roman wrestling
Olympic wrestlers of Latvia
Wrestlers at the 2004 Summer Olympics
Sportspeople from Riga
Wrestlers at the 2015 European Games
European Games competitors for Latvia